The Krasukha (English: Belladonna or Deadly Nightshade) is a Russian mobile, ground-based, electronic warfare (EW) system. This system is produced by the KRET corporation on different wheeled platforms. The Krasukha's primary targets are airborne radio-electronics (such as UAVs) and airborne systems guided by radar. The Krasukha has multiple applications in the Russian Armed Forces.

Krasukha-2

The Krasukha-2 can also jam other airborne radars, such as those for radar-guided missiles. The missiles, once jammed, then receive a false target away from the original to ensure that the missiles no longer pose a threat. The Krasukha-2 guards mobile high-priority targets such as the 9K720 Iskander SRBM.

Krasukha-4
The Krasukha-4 is a broadband multifunctional jamming station mounted on a BAZ-6910-022 four-axle-chassis. It complements the Krasukha-2 system by operating in the X-band and Ku-band, and counters airborne radar aircraft such as the  Joint Surveillance Target Attack Radar System (JSTAR) Northrop Grumman E-8. The Krasukha-4 has enough range to effectively disrupt low Earth orbit (LEO) satellites and can cause permanent damage to targeted radio-electronic devices. Ground based radars are also a viable target for the Krasukha-4.

Operators
 
 Russian Ground Forces

Operational history
Krasukha jammers were reportedly deployed to support Russian forces in Syria. They have reportedly been blocking small U.S. surveillance drones from receiving GPS satellite signals. During the Turkish intervention in the Syrian civil war, the complex apparently destroyed a Bayraktar drone by causing it to lose control, subsequently crashing.

In July 2018, an OSCE monitoring mission drone recorded a 1L269 Krasukha-2 among other electronic warfare equipment deployed near Chornukhyne, Ukraine.

In 2020, Krasukha was reportedly operating around the Russian military base at Gyumri in Armenia to counter the use by Azerbaijan of Turkish-made Bayraktar armed drones as well as Israel-made Harop loitering munition (suicide drones).

The first export contract was officially signed in August 2021.

Krasukha-4 models are also being employed in the ongoing Russian invasion of Ukraine, as Ukrainian forces captured one of these devices in the field near Kyiv. A photograph posted to social media claims to show part of the system, which has been separated from its truck mount and shows some damage. The unit was then sent to the United States for examination.

See also
Repellent-1

References

Concern Radio-Electronic Technologies
Electronic warfare equipment
Electronic warfare
Military electronics of Russia
Military vehicles introduced in the 2010s
Military vehicles of Russia
Modern military equipment of Russia